Aleksandr Fyodorovich Khvan (born 28 December 1957 in Cheboksary, Chuvash ASSR) is a Russian film director and actor. His debut film Dyuba-Dyuba was entered into the 1993 Cannes Film Festival.

Filmography
 Dyuba-Dyuba (1992)
 Pribytiye poyezda (1995)
 Dryan khoroshaya, dryan plokhaya (1998)
 It Is Easy to Die (1999)
 Shatun (2001)
 Carmen (2003)

References

External links

1957 births
Koryo-saram
Living people
Russian film directors
Russian male film actors
People from Cheboksary
Male actors of Korean descent